The Punjab Regiment is the second oldest regiments still in service in the Indian Army, and is the most senior regional infantry regiment. It was formed from the 2nd Punjab Regiment of the
British Indian Army in 1947 and has taken part in various battles and wars since, winning numerous honours for the same.

Prior to independence and partition there were a number of "Punjab Regiments" in the British Indian Army. These were amalgamated to form six regiments: the 1st Punjab Regiment, the 2nd Punjab Regiment, the 8th Punjab Regiment, the 14th Punjab Regiment, the 15th Punjab Regiment and the 16th Punjab Regiment. At the onset of independence in 1947, the 1st, 8th, 14th, 15th and 16th Punjab Regiments went over to the newly raised Pakistan Army, while the 2nd Punjab Regiment was retained in the Indian Army. Troops were transferred between regiments based on whether the soldiers would be a part of Pakistan or India.

History

The Punjab Regiment is one of the oldest in the Indian Army. The first battalion which today constitutes this regiment was raised in 1805, by the then Maharaja of Patiala. The first four British-raised battalions of what later became the 2nd Punjab Regiment and finally the Punjab Regiment, were raised during the hostilities in the Carnatic in South India between 1761 and 1776. The first and second battalions have been moved to other regiments and the fourth battalion was disbanded. The third battalion still continues as part of the regiment. The numbers and titles of the battalions changed during the successive reorganisations of the Madras Presidency Army, the British Indian Army and the Indian Army during the 18th, 19th and 20th centuries. The names changed from Coast Sepoys to Carnatic Infantry, Madras Native Infantry, Punjabis and finally to the Punjab Regiment. After the Indian Rebellion of 1857, the British applied the martial races theory and north Indian troops replaced the south Indians, the regiment eventually being renamed as the Punjab Regiment.

The 1st battalion of the 2nd Punjab Regiment initially formed part of the 44th Airborne Division in an airborne role on the disbandment of the Parachute Regiment in 1946 and was called 1st battalion, 2nd Punjab Regiment (Para). The unit retained most of the Punjab Regiment's uniform, but donned the maroon beret, qualification wings and allied insignias of airborne forces. In 1952, when the Parachute Regiment was re-raised and a Regimental Centre formed, the 1st battalion, 2nd Punjab Regiment (Para) became the first battalion of the Parachute Regiment and was renamed as the 1st battalion, Parachute Regiment (Punjab). The uniform changed to the Parachute Regiment's, but the battalion retained the Punjab Regiment's hackle on its headgear.

In 1951, four experienced battalions of the former princely states of Punjab joined the Regiment. These were a battalion each from the Jind and Nabha State Forces and the first and second Battalions of Patiala Infantry. They were designated as the 13th, 14th, 15th and 16th battalions of the Punjab Regiment. Additional battalions have been raised since 1963.

15 Punjab
15 Punjab (formerly First Patiala) completed 300 years of service on 13 April 2005. The battalion was raised on the auspicious Baisakhi Shri Guru Gobind Singh Ji day in 1705 by Baba Alla Singh, the founder of Patiala State. It was the first battalion of the state forces of the Maharaja of Patiala. Apart from being the oldest infantry battalion in the Indian Army, 15 Punjab also has the proud distinction of being the second highest decorated battalion of the Army, with 22 Battle Honours, one Theatre Honour (Punjab) and numerous gallantry awards. The battalion took part in numerous campaigns in India and abroad, carving a mark for itself in every operation. In May 1900, the battalion was re-designated as First Patiala Imperial Service Infantry (Rajindra Sikh). During World War I, it took part in operations in the Middle East under the British Expeditionary Force. In 1932, the battalion was re-designated as First Patiala Rajindra Sikh Infantry. During World War II, the battalion participated in the Burma Campaign. It successfully cut off the Japanese lines of communication, thus halting their advance towards India. Thereafter, the battalion sailed to Port Dickson for action in Malaya and Batavia (now Java).

2 Punjab
2 Punjab (now 1st battalion, Brigade of the Guards) was raised in 1762 as the tenth battalion of the Coastal Sepoys and has been redesignated eighteen times since then. The troop composition of the unit was changed to a North Zone Battalion in 1902 and the unit was redesignated as 69 Punjab. In 1922, the unit was redesignated as 2nd battalion, 2 Punjab Regiment. The battalion, by virtue of its seniority and efficiency, was handpicked by the then Chief of the Army Staff, Gen. (later Field Marshal) K. M. Cariappa to be redesignated as 1st battalion, Brigade of the Guards, in April 1951. Lt. Col. (later Brigadier) Shivinder Singh was the first commanding officer of the battalion. Since then, 22 commanding officers have commanded the battalion. Of them, Lt. Col. M.C.S Menon, Lt. Col. Sehdev Sahgal and Lt. Col. P.P Singh retired as Generals.

UN Peacekeeping Operations
In recent years, the Punjab Regiment has contributed towards UN peacekeeping missions by sending six of its battalions overseas: 3 Punjab to Gaza, 14 Punjab to Angola, 15 and 26 Punjab to Lebanon and 16 and 24 Punjab to the Democratic Republic of the Congo.

Regimental Centre
The Regimental Centre was first raised at Loralai and was shifted to Multan in 1922, Meerut in 1929 and its present location in Ramgarh Cantonment, Jharkhand, in 1976.

Units
 3rd Battalion
 9th Battalion
 13th Battalion - (former Jind Infantry) - Princely State Forces unit of Imperial Service Troops
 14th Battalion - (former Nabha Akal Infantry) - Princely State Forces unit of Imperial Service Troops
 15th Battalion - (former 1st Patiala Rajinder Sikh Infantry) - Princely State Forces unit of Imperial Service Troops
 16th Battalion - (former 2nd Patiala Yadvinder Infantry) - Princely State Forces unit of Imperial Service Troops
 17th Battalion
 18th Battalion
 19th Battalion
 20th Battalion
 21st Battalion
 22nd Battalion
 23rd Battalion
 24th Battalion
 25th Battalion
 26th Battalion
 27th Battalion
 28th Battalion
 29th Battalion
 30th Battalion
 31st Battalion
 102nd Infantry Battalion Territorial Army (Punjab) : Kalka, Haryana
 150th Infantry Battalion Territorial Army (Punjab) : New Delhi 
 156th Infantry Battalion Territorial Army (Punjab) (Home and Hearth) Punjab : Rajouri, Jammu & Kashmir 
 7th Battalion Rashtriya Rifles
 22nd Battalion Rashtriya Rifles
 37th Battalion Rashtriya Rifles
 53rd Battalion Rashtriya Rifles
Others:
 1st Battalion is now 1st Battalion, Parachute Regiment (Special Forces)
 2nd Battalion is now 1st Battalion, Brigade of the Guards (Mechanized)
 4th Battalion was disbanded in 1938
 7th Battalion is now 8th Battalion, Mechanised Infantry Regiment
 8th Battalion was disbanded after World War II
 10th Battalion is the Punjab Regimental Centre

Class Composition
The original battalions of the regiment that were transferred to India after 1947 were composed primarily of Sikh and Dogra soldiers who belonged to the districts of Punjab that were given to Pakistan. However the second and third generations for the regiment were recruited both among this refugee community but recruitment was opened up to all castes and communities of Punjab, Haryana, Jammu and Himachal Pradesh in the late 1960s. The  regiment currently consists of  Dogras and Sikhs primarily drawn from north Indian regions of Jammu, Himachal Pradesh and Punjab. However, as an exception, two regular battalions (19 and 27 Punjab) have troops from  other Indian castes as well.

Key Battles

Battle of Longewala

During the Indo-Pakistan War of 1971, A Company (reinforced) of the 23rd battalion, Punjab Regiment, consisting of about 120 soldiers under the command of Major (later Brigadier) Kuldip Singh Chandpuri, fought off an assault by a brigade of the Pakistan Army. The battle was fought at the desert border post of Longewala, Rajasthan. The unit fought during the last five hours of the night of 5 December 1971 unsupported as the Indian Air Force aircraft at the time did not have night attack capabilities. For his leadership during the battle, Maj. Chandpuri was decorated with the Maha Vir Chakra, the second highest gallantry award in India.

Regimental Insignia
The regiment is perhaps the only infantry regiment with naval galley as an insignia, anywhere. It was awarded to 69th Punjabis (later 2nd Punjab) in recognition of the readiness to serve overseas, after the battalion had fought in eight overseas campaigns by 1824.

Battle honours

Pre-Independence
Sholinghur, Carnatic, Mysore, Mehidpore, Ava, China, Pegu, Lucknow, Burma, Afghanistan, Laos, Flanders, Hellis, Krithia, Gallipoli, Suez, Egypt, Sharon, Nablus, Palestine, Aden, Kut-al-Amara, Baghdad, Mesopotamia, North Western Frontier, Mersa Metruh, Buthidaung, Ngakyedauk Pass, Imphal, Kangla Tongbi, Tonzang, Kennedy Peak, Meiktila, pyinmana, Malaya, Ipoh, Singapore, Kern and Casa Bettini.

Post-Independence
Zoji La, Ichhogil, Dograi, Barki, Kalidhar, Bedori, Nangi Tekri, Brachil Pass, Laungewala, Garibpur, Chak Amaru and Jessore

In fiction
Films
 Border, a 1997 Bollywood film directed by J.P.Dutta, depicts the Battle of Longewala.
 Lakshya, a 2004 Bollywood film depicting the Kargil War, places the protagonist (played by Hrithik Roshan) as an acting captain in 3 Punjab.

See also
 Punjab Regiment (Pakistan)

References

Military units and formations established in 1761
Military units and formations established in 1922
P
P
Honourable East India Company regiments